La Finca is the Dominican adaptation of reality television series The Farm. The show is a co-production between Tania Báez and company MediaWorld Dominicana.

The series debuted on May 23, 2010, and ran until August 29, 2010. The series ran for 13 episodes airing on Sunday at 8pm with repeats Tuesdays at 9pm.

10 Dominican celebrities joined the cast as contestants.

Contestants

Nominations

References 
https://web.archive.org/web/20100515034937/http://www.remolacha.net/2010/05/videopromo-del-reality-dominicano-la-finca.html

The Farm (franchise)
Dominican Republic television series
2010 Dominican Republic television series debuts
2010 Dominican Republic television series endings